This is a list of German television related events from 1990.

Events
29 March - Chris Kempers & Daniel Kovac are selected to represent Germany at the 1990 Eurovision Song Contest with their song "Frei zu leben". They are selected to be the thirty-fifth German Eurovision entry during Ein Lied für Zagreb held at the German Theatre in Munich.
8 July - West Germany beat Argentina 1-0 to win the 1990 World Cup at Rome, Italy.
3 October - German reunification: All FTA channels broadcast reunification themed events in Berlin and other major cities.

Debuts

Domestic
 7 January - Talk im Turm (1990–1999) (Sat. 1)
 19 January - Zeil um Zehn (1990–1993) (Hessen 3)
 21 January - Tutti Frutti (1990–1993) (RTL)
 23 August - Mit den Clowns kamen die Tränen (1990) (Das Erste)
 17 October - Ein Schloß am Wörthersee (1990–1993) (RTL)
 27 December - Kartoffeln mit Stippe (1990) (ZDF)

International
 9 January -  Hey Dad..! (1987–1994) (Das Erste)
 21 March -  Moonlighting (1985–1989) (RTLplus)
 21 July -  Teenage Mutant Ninja Turtles (1987–1996) (RTL)
 8 September -  Count Duckula (1988–1993) (Das Erste)
 13 October - / Alfred J. Kwak (1989–1990) (ZDF)
 10 November - / Pingu (1986-2006, 2017–Present) (ZDF)
 13 November - / Babar (1989–1991) (ARD)
 December - / My Pet Monster (1987) (Tele 5)

Armed Forces Network
 The Super Mario Bros. Super Show! (1989)
 Eureeka's Castle (1989–1995)
 Chip 'n Dale: Rescue Rangers (1989–1990)
/ Beetlejuice (1989–1991)
 Garfield and Friends (1988–1994)

BFBS
 24 September -  Emlyn's Moon (1990)
 1 October -  The Brollys (1990)
 10 October -  The Dreamstone (1990–1995)
 12 October -  Rosie and Jim (1990–2000)
 2 November -  How 2 (1990–2006)
 3 December -  Keeping Up Appearances (1990–1995)
 12 December -  Uncle Jack (1990–1993)
 Nellie the Elephant (1990–1991)
 Round the Twist (1989–2001)
 Alfonso Bonzo (1990–1991)
 Tales of Aesop (1990)
 Kappatoo (1990–1992)
 The Gift (1990)
// The Further Adventures of SuperTed (1989)

Television shows

1950s
Tagesschau (1952–present)

1960s
 heute (1963-present)

1970s
 heute-journal (1978-present)
 Tagesthemen (1978-present)

1980s
Wetten, dass..? (1981-2014)
Lindenstraße (1985–present)

Ending this year
22 December - Formel Eins (1983-1990)

Births

Deaths